"Euchontha" castrona is a moth of the family Notodontidae first described by William Warren in 1906. It is found in Brazil.

Taxonomy
The species does not belong in Euchontha, but has not been placed in another genus yet.

References

Moths described in 1906
Notodontidae of South America